Mario Frustalupi (12 September 1942 – 14 April 1990) was an Italian footballer, who played as a midfielder.

Playing career
Born in Orvieto (Umbria), Frustalupi debuted in Italian Serie A in 1963 with Sampdoria, for which he played in 8 seasons. In 1970, he moved to FC Internazionale, then in need of a replace for Luis Suárez, but Frustalupi disappointed the premises. With the Milanese team he won a scudetto and reached the final of the European Cup in 1972, losing against Ajax.

The following year he was sold to S.S. Lazio. Although he often quarrelled with the club's leading star striker Giorgio Chinaglia, he contributed to make the team one of the strongest in Italy, as shown by the side's scudetto victory in 1974. He also had a successful stint with A.C. Cesena, which under him reached its best result ever in the league, a sixth-place finish in Serie A and the right to play in the UEFA Cup.

In 1977 Frustalupi went to Pistoiese, being a protagonist of the first team's promotion to Serie A. He retired in 1981.

Death
Frustalupi died on the highway near San Salvatore Monferrato in a car accident in 1990, while he was going to Cervinia to join the family in holidays.

References 

1942 births
1990 deaths
People from Orvieto
Italian footballers
Serie A players
Serie B players
Inter Milan players
A.C. Cesena players
Empoli F.C. players
S.S. Lazio players
U.C. Sampdoria players
Road incident deaths in Italy
U.S. Pistoiese 1921 players
Sportspeople from the Province of Terni
Association football midfielders
Footballers from Umbria